Murrumbeena railway station is located on the Pakenham and Cranbourne lines in Victoria, Australia. It serves the south-eastern Melbourne suburb of Murrumbeena, and it opened on 14 May 1879.

History

Opening one month after the railway line from Caulfield was extended to Oakleigh, Murrumbeena station gets its name from Mirambena Road, its name believed to be derived from an Indigenous word meaning 'belonging to you', 'welcome', or 'land of frogs'. The name may also refer to an Indigenous member of the native police.

A siding was once located at the Down end of Platform 2. In 1972, it was reduced in length and, in 1977, it was removed altogether.

The station once had a signal box at the Up end of Platform 1, which was removed in 1979, when boom barriers were provided at the former Murrumbeena Road level crossing, which was also located at the Up end of the station.

In March 2014, the Level Crossing Removal Authority announced a grade separation project to replace the Murrumbeena Road level crossing immediately to the west of the station, being done so as part of its elevated railway project. The historic station (protected by a local heritage overlay) and associated footbridge were removed and replaced with a temporary station until the completion of the project. In June 2018, trains commenced operating on the new elevated lines.

Platforms and services

Murrumbeena has one island platform with two faces. It is serviced by Metro Trains' Pakenham and Cranbourne line services.

Platform 1:
  all stations and limited express services to Flinders Street
  all stations and limited express services to Flinders Street

Platform 2:
  all stations and limited express services to Pakenham
  all stations services to Cranbourne

Future services:
In addition to the current services the Network Development Plan Metropolitan Rail proposes linking the Pakenham and Cranbourne lines to both the Sunbury line and under-construction Melbourne Airport rail link via the Metro Tunnel.
  express services to West Footscray and Sunbury (2025 onwards)
  express services to Melbourne Airport (2029 onwards)

Transport links

CDC Melbourne operates one route via Murrumbeena station, under contract to Public Transport Victoria:
 : Kew – Oakleigh station

Ventura Bus Lines operates two routes via Murrumbeena station, under contract to Public Transport Victoria:
 : Moorabbin station – Chadstone Shopping Centre
 : Chadstone Shopping Centre – Sandringham station

Gallery

References

External links
 
 Melway map at street-directory.com.au

Railway stations in Melbourne
Railway stations in Australia opened in 1879
Railway stations in the City of Glen Eira